The flea-frog (Brachycephalus hermogenesi) is a species of frog in the family Brachycephalidae.
It is endemic to Brazil and its distribution includes the states of São Paulo and Rio de Janeiro.

Its natural habitat is subtropical or tropical moist lowland forests.
It is threatened by habitat loss.

Brachycephalus hermogenesi is part of the dull colored assemblage of the family Brachycephalidae and is distinguished from other species of the genus Brachycephalus  by its complex calling activity.

References

2006 IUCN Red List of Threatened Species.   Downloaded on 23 July 2007.
 Verdade, V. K., Rodrigues, M. T., Cassimiro, J., Pavan, D., Liou, N., & Lange, M. C. (2008). "Advertisement call, vocal activity, and geographic distribution of Brachycephalus hermogenesi" (Giaretta and Sawaya, 1998)(Anura, Brachycephalidae). Journal of Herpetology, 42(3), 542–550.

Brachycephalus
Endemic fauna of Brazil
Amphibians of Brazil
Taxonomy articles created by Polbot
Amphibians described in 1998